Paulien is a Dutch feminine given name cognate to Pauline. People with the name include:

 (born 1976), Dutch writer, columnist and cabaret performer
Paulien van Deutekom (1981–2019), Dutch speed skater
Paulien van Dooremalen (born 1985) Dutch badminton player
Paulien Hogeweg (born 1943), Dutch theoretical biologist
Paulien Mathues (born 1994), Flemish singer
 (born 1967), Dutch jazz singer and composer

See also
Jon Paulien (born 1949), a Seventh-day Adventist theologian 
Pauliena Rooijakkers (born 1993), Dutch road cyclist
Saint-Paulien. a commune in south-central France

Dutch feminine given names